is a tokusatsu superhero movie, and part of the Ultra Series franchise, released in 2000. The movie is a direct sequel to the original Ultraman Tiga television series, serving as an epilogue to the events between Tiga and the successor series, Ultraman Dyna.
A TPC excursion (including GUTS' Captain Megumi Iruma) heads to old ruins and unintentionally wakes up three evil ancient giants. Daigo's impending marriage to fellow GUTS member Rena is interrupted by a mysterious woman who hands him a black Sparklence, as well as disturbing visions of an evil, dark Tiga and three other mysterious giants. Daigo must discover the truth and history behind his visions, and defeat the darkness one more time.

Plot

Set two years after Tiga's final battle, Daigo is approached by a mysterious woman, Camearra, who possessed a dark version of the Sparklence. It is then revealed that more than 30,000,000 years ago, Tiga was originally evil in nature, part of a group of four that dominated Earth. The group consisted of Dark Tiga, the telepathic Camearra (gold patterns on silver skin), the powerful Darramb (red patterns on silver) and the speedy Hudra (purple patterns on silver). One day, Tiga fell in love with a local human woman, and decided to convert from darkness to protect her from harm. Being the weakest of the four, Tiga quickly became a target of the group. However, unbeknownst to the group, the original "talentless" Tiga Dark possessed the ability to absorb powers from fallen enemies. As he eliminated each of the three dark members and sealed them away, he absorbed their powers which explains the new Tiga's color patterns (purple, red and gold lined with his original silver). Convinced by his ability to convert the last known Sparklence to good, Daigo accepts the gift and becomes Tiga once again, survives his inner struggles and vanishes the darkness within. Soon after this, he marries Rena Yanase, fellow GUTS member and longtime love interest (Shin Asuka, Dyna's eventual human host, also makes a cameo during the finale as a junior crew member, in a symbolic passing of the torch moment).

Cast
: 
: 
: 
: 
: 
: 
: 
: 
: 
: 
: 
: 
: 
Red balloon girl: 
Researchers: , 
: 
Priest: 
Mai's friends: , 
Daigo's caretaker: 
Rena's caretaker: 
: 
: 
: 
: 
: 
: 
: 
: 
: 
, :

Theme songs
Ending theme
"TAKE ME HIGHER"
Lyrics: 
Composition: Giancarlo Pasquini, Jennifer Batten, Alberto Emilio Contini
Arrangement: 
String Arrangement: 
Choral Arrangement: 
Artist: V6

Insert theme
"Brave Love, TIGA"
Lyrics: 
Composition: 
Arrangement: 
Artist:

Release
In July 2000, Ultraman Tiga: The Final Odyssey premiered in Japanese with English subtitles at the Egyptian Theater in Hollywood, California, as part of the annual G-Fest convention, but it was not released domestically in the United States for home viewing.

References

Films set in 2012
2000 films
Ultra Series films
Ultraman Tiga
2000s Japanese films